Deutschmann is a German surname. Notable people with the surname include:

Christoph Deutschmann (born 1946), German sociologist
Johann Deutschmann (1625–1706), German Lutheran theologian
Josef Deutschmann (born 1920), Austrian cross-country skier
Cara Deutschmann (born 2000), Austrian person of the year

German-language surnames